Owczary  (Rykhval’d) is a village in the administrative district of Gmina Sękowa, within Gorlice County, Lesser Poland Voivodeship, in southern Poland, close to the border with Slovakia.

In Owczary is buried the Polish resistance fighter, Maria Kotarba .

References

Owczary
Kingdom of Galicia and Lodomeria
Kraków Voivodeship (1919–1939)